Victor Oliver Agapito  (born October 6, 1973) is a Filipino former professional basketball player in the Philippine Basketball Association. He also briefly played in the Metropolitan Basketball Association.

References
Hardcourt: The Official Philippine Basketball Association Annual

External links
Official website
MYPBA.com
http://hoopedia.nba.com/index.php/Category:Philippine_Basketball_Association

1973 births
Living people
Basketball players from Palawan
Centers (basketball)
Benilde Blazers basketball players
People from Puerto Princesa
Philippines men's national basketball team players
Filipino men's basketball players
Tanduay Rhum Masters players
De La Salle Green Archers basketball players
Tanduay Rhum Masters draft picks